Hicap is a mobile technology developed by Nippon Telegraph and Telephone as a higher capacity alternative to their NTT mobile solution.

Hicap uses a 25 kHz carrier and uses FDMA to separate different calls from each other.

External links
http://www.mobileworld.org/analog_about.html

Mobile radio telephone systems